The Women's Cricket Challenge Trophy, officially the Shaheed Mohtarma Benazir Bhutto Women's Cricket Challenge Trophy, was a women's domestic Twenty20 competition that took place in Pakistan between 2011–12 and 2016–17. The tournament included both provincial and departmental teams, and took place alongside the National Women's Cricket Championship.

Zarai Taraqiati Bank Limited were the most successful side in the history of the competition, winning four titles outright and sharing one title with Omar Associates.

History
The Shaheed Mohtarma Benazir Bhutto Women's Cricket Challenge Trophy began in the 2011–12 season, named after former Pakistan Prime Minister Benazir Bhutto. The tournament took place across three days in January 2012, in Lahore, with six teams competing in two groups of three. Zarai Taraqiati Bank Limited won the tournament, beating Punjab in the final by 93 runs. The following season, 2012–13, saw the same two teams reach the final, and saw Zarai Taraqiati Bank Limited again emerge victorious.

The following tournament, 2014, saw just four teams competing in a round-robin group: Zarai Taraqiati Bank Limited, Higher Education Commission, Omar Associates and Saif Sports Saga. Zarai Taraqiati Bank Limited and Omar Associates reached the final, which was rained off after 11.2 overs. The title was therefore shared between the two sides.

In 2015–16, the teams were joined by State Bank of Pakistan, who subsequently reached the final. There, they were beaten by Zarai Taraqiati Bank Limited by 70 runs. In the final season of the tournament, 2016–17, four teams competed: Zarai Taraqiati Bank Limited, State Bank of Pakistan, Higher Education Commission and a PCB XI. State Bank of Pakistan and Zarai Taraqiati Bank Limited again reached the final, and Zarai Taraqiati Bank Limited again emerged victorious, winning their fifth title. In 2018, the tournament was replaced by the Departmental T20 Women's Championship.

Teams

Note: The Omar Associates and Zarai Taraqiati Bank Limited totals include one shared title.

Results

See also
 Departmental T20 Women's Championship
 PCB Triangular Twenty20 Women's Tournament

Notes

References

Pakistani domestic cricket competitions
Women's cricket competitions in Pakistan
Recurring sporting events established in 2012
2012 establishments in Pakistan
Twenty20 cricket leagues